Bradley Rangers F.C. was an English association football club based in Huddersfield, West Yorkshire.

History
The club competed in the Yorkshire Football League and the Northern Counties East League, as well as the FA Vase.
The club folded during the 1992–93 season and their playing record expunged.

References

Defunct football clubs in England
Yorkshire Football League
Northern Counties East Football League
Defunct football clubs in West Yorkshire
Association football clubs disestablished in 1992